James Chandler (born January 17, 1948) is the director of the Franke Institute for the Humanities and holds the Barbara E. & Richard J. Franke Professorship in English Language and Literature at the University of Chicago. He was previously the George M. Pullman Professor in English Language & Literature at the same institution.

Chandler is the author of three books on English Romanticism:  Wordsworth's Second Nature (1984), England in 1819: The Politics of Literary Culture and the Case of Romantic Historicism, which won the 2000 Gordon J. Laing Award for distinction in academic publishing, and An Archeology of Sympathy: The Sentimental Mode in Literature and Cinema (2013), which examines continuities between the Romantic culture of sentiment and twentieth-century film.

References

External links

University of Chicago Experts
University of Chicago Faculty
Franke Institute for the Humanities

1948 births
Living people
American male writers
University of Chicago faculty
Place of birth missing (living people)